Harman Creek (also called Harmon Branch) is a stream in Crawford County in the U.S. state of Missouri. It is a tributary of the Meramec River.

The stream source area lies just south of Missouri Route 8 about one mile east of the community of Elayer. The stream joins the Meramec about two miles south-southeast of Onondaga Cave State Park.

Harman Creek has the name of the local Harman family.

See also
List of rivers of Missouri

References

Rivers of Crawford County, Missouri
Rivers of Missouri